The United Nations Educational, Scientific and Cultural Organization (UNESCO) World Heritage Sites are places of importance to cultural or natural heritage as described in the 1972 UNESCO World Heritage Convention. The sites of natural and cultural heritage in Madagascar became eligible for inclusion on the list when that state ratified the convention on July 19, 1983.

The first site in Madagascar, the Strict Nature Reserve of the Tsingy of Bemaraha, was inscribed on the list as a site of natural importance at the 14th Session of the World Heritage Committee, held in Banff, Canada in 1990. This was followed by the 2001 inscription of the Royal Hill of Ambohimanga, a historic village and royal palace compound of cultural importance featuring well-preserved 19th-century palaces and numerous other natural and architectural features of historic, political and spiritual significance to the Malagasy people. Most recently, in 2007 the natural site of the Rainforests of the Atsinanana was added to the list, comprising a cluster of six national parks distinguished by their highly endemic biodiversity. A fourth site, the capital of the 19th century Merina sovereigns of Madagascar at the Rova of Antananarivo, had originally been slated to become the nation's first cultural World Heritage Site in 1995 but was destroyed by a fire shortly before the inscription was finalized.

In addition to Madagascar's three established sites, a further seven sites are listed as tentative and are under consideration by the UNESCO World Heritage Committee for elevation to official status. Five initial sites were inscribed on the tentative list in 1997: the Betafo Riziculture and Hydraulic Landscape, the Royal Compound of Tsinjoarivo), the Mahafaly Country of Southwestern Madagascar, the Cliff and Caves of Isandra, and Antongona. In 2008, two additional sites were added to the list: Anjanaharibe-Sud Special Reserve (an extension of the Rainforests of the Atsinanana) and the Dry Forests of the Andrefana.

UNESCO placed the Rainforests of the Atsinanana on the list of World Heritage in Danger on July 30, 2010 following an increase in illegal logging in the parks since 2009 as a consequence of the 2009-2013 political crisis in Madagascar.

World Heritage Sites 
In the following table, the UNESCO data includes the site's reference number and the criteria it was listed under: criteria i through vi are cultural, whereas vii through x are natural.

Tentative list 

In addition to the sites inscribed on the World Heritage list, member states can maintain a list of tentative sites that they may consider for nomination. Nominations for the World Heritage list are only accepted if the site was previously listed on the tentative list. As of 2017, Madagascar recorded eight sites on its tentative list.

See also
 UNESCO Intangible Cultural Heritage Lists

References

External links
 Official photographs and descriptions of Madagascar's tentative World Heritage List sites 

Madagascar
 List
Madagascar geography-related lists
World Heritage Sites